The Australian Centre for Christianity and Culture is a national Christian ecumenical centre, established in 1993, in Canberra, the national capital of Australia. It encourages dialogue and cooperation among Christian churches and between Christianity and other faiths, as well as exploring issues relating to reconciliation in Australia and the interface between Christian faith and Australian culture. The Centre is a research centre within Charles Sturt University, through a formal partnership established in 1998 between the Anglican Diocese of Canberra and Goulburn and the University and is affiliated with United Theological College and St Mark's National Theological Centre.

History of the Site
The land on which the Centre is located was Ngunnawal country, and the Centre acknowledges the Ngunnawal as the traditional custodians. Following European settlement, it became known as Rottenbury Hill, after George Rottenbury, an early settler.

The American architect Walter Burley Griffin’s design for the new, planned city of Canberra was accepted in 1912. Griffin’s design included sites for national cathedrals or churches for each of the main Christian denominations. The Church of England (as the Anglican Church was then called) site was Rattonbury Hill.

It was dedicated by the acting Primate, Charles Riley, the Archbishop of Perth on Sunday 8 May 1927 for use as a national cathedral: the National Library of Australia holds the Mildenhall Collection of photographs of early Canberra, including one of the dedication.  The following day, the Duke of York inaugurated the new national capital. That afternoon a RAAF plane crash-landed on Rattonbury Hill, with the pilot subsequently dying of his injuries.

Section 9 of the Australian Constitution requires that all land within the Seat of Government (now the Australian Capital Territory) be held by way of a leasehold interest. The terms of the original leases in the Federal Capital Territory (as the ACT was known until 1938) required that work be commenced on building within two years.  Prompted by Lewis Radford, the Bishop of Goulburn (which included the FCT), the Church’s General Synod Canberra Committee held an open competition for the design of a cathedral and associated buildings. That competition was won by Harold Crone.

Radford’s successor Ernest Burgmann, who renamed the diocese ‘Canberra and Goulburn’ in 1950, was less enthusiastic about a national cathedral. He established St Mark’s Library (now St Mark’s National Theological Centre) on the Rattonbury Hill site in 1957. By this time Burgmann’s idea for the site had developed into a collegiate church, on the model of Westminster Abbey.

Little real progress occurred, and a successor bishop, Cecil Warren sought approval from General Synod in 1981 for a national ‘Great Church’ to be completed in time for the Australian Bicentenary in 1988. This proposal was badly received, and reduced to just ‘a national project’.

The site was finally developed following a change of direction, led by the then bishop, George Browning, the Governor-General, William Deane and the Indigenous leader Lowitja O'Donoghue.

The Centre
The Centre is located on a small knoll overlooking Lake Burley Griffin on Kings Avenue and immediately south of the Parliamentary Triangle in the heart of Canberra. The administration building George Browning House is adjacent to St Mark's National Theological Centre.

Atop the site is a tall, stylised, steel cross, on the centreline of the major axis of the Centre's building plan. Down this axis is a ceremonial fire pit, then a grassed amphitheatre area that will eventually be enclosed, then the main building of the Centre's auditorium and chapel. Beside the chapel is the Great Bell (John Taylor & Co, 1986).

The Pilgrim's Walk leads away from the centre's building to the Pilgrim Poles, the labyrinth and the Bible Garden. The Bible Garden features plants described in the texts of the bible. It was established with a benevolent grant from The Bible Garden Trust and opened in 2008.

Structure

Board
The Centre has a Board with a wide representation of Australian Christian denominations and communities. Members include:
 Lawrie Willett AO (Chair)
 Roger Beale AO
 Mr Paul Bongiorno AM
 Ms Cheryl Cartwright
 The Honourable Dr Ken Crispin QC
 Mr Paul Dowler
 Father Peter L'Estrange SJ AO
 Rt Rev'd Professor Stephen Pickard (Executive Director)
 Most Rev Dr Christopher Prowse
 Justice Richard Refshauge
 Mr Clive Rodger
 Lieutenant General (Retd) John Sanderson AC, former Governor of Western Australia
 Mr Brendan Smyth

Former Board members have included:
 Margaret Reid, former Senator and President of the Australian Senate, (inaugural President of the Board)
 Mark Coleridge
 Lin Hatfield Dodds, Director of UnitingCare Australia;
 Presiding Officer: Professor Ross Chambers, Deputy Vice-Chancellor (Academic), Charles Sturt University.

Executive Director
 Rt Rev'd Professor Stephen Pickard (2015–present)
 Rev Prof Dr James Haire, Professor of Theology at Charles Sturt University, immediate past President of the National Council of Churches in Australia, formerly President of the Uniting Church in Australia 2000-2003.

The first ED, from 1999, was Rev Dr David Millikan, former head of religious programming with the Australian Broadcasting Commission, founding director of the Zadok Centre, commentator and filmmaker.

Secretariat
A small secretariat operates the Centre.

See also
 List of buildings and structures in the Australian Capital Territory

References

Further reading
 Ayre, Gretel, Visions on Rottenberry Hill : the story of the Australian Centre for Christianity and Culture, Charles Sturt University, 2001, 
	

Churches in Canberra
Tourist attractions in Canberra